Once in a Lifetime is a 1925 American silent comedy drama film directed by Duke Worne and starring Ashton Dearholt, Theodore Lorch and Les Bates.

Synopsis
A young man addicted into golf enjoys a series of adventures in which he rescues the Mayor's daughter from an attacker, and later saves her father from assassination from the same man.

Cast
 Ashton Dearholt as Glenn Horton
 Mary Beth Milford as Edna Perry
 Wilbur Higgins as Martin Perry
 Theodore Lorch as Tommy
 Les Bates as Hobo
 John M. O'Brien as Marty Taylor

References

Bibliography
 Munden, Kenneth White. The American Film Institute Catalog of Motion Pictures Produced in the United States, Part 1. University of California Press, 1997.

External links
 

1925 films
1925 drama films
1920s English-language films
American silent feature films
Silent American drama films
Films directed by Duke Worne
Rayart Pictures films
1920s American films